USCS Belle was a schooner that served as a survey ship in the United States Coast Survey from 1848 to 1857.

The Coast Survey acquired Belle from the United States Army Quartermaster Department in 1848 and placed her in service along the United States Gulf Coast, where she spent her entire Coast Survey career.

Belle sank in a gale at the end of the 1853 surveying season, but she was raised in 1854 and returned to service. She was lost on an uncharted shoal off St. Andrews Bay, Florida, in 1857.

References
NOAA History, A Science Odyssey: Tools of the Trade: Ships: Coast and Geodetic Survey Ships: Belle

Ships of the United States Coast Survey
Schooners of the United States
Maritime incidents in 1853
Maritime incidents in 1857
Shipwrecks of the Florida coast